The 2004 Tro-Bro Léon was the 21st edition of the Tro-Bro Léon cycle race and was held on 25 April 2004. The race was won by Samuel Dumoulin.

General classification

References

2004
2004 in road cycling
2004 in French sport
April 2004 sports events in France